Why I Love You may refer to:

 "Why I Love You" (B2K song), 2002
 "Why I Love You" (Jay-Z and Kanye West song), 2011

See also 
 "Why Do I Love You", a song by Westlife from the 2001 album World of Our Own
 "I Love You So" ("I <3 U So"), a song by Cassius sampled in the Kanye West and Jay-Z song
 "Sixteen Reasons (Why I Love You)", a song by Connie Francis